Gil Vermouth (born August 5, 1985) is an Israeli former professional footballer who played as an attacking midfielder or winger.

Club career
Vermouth is Jewish, and was born in Kiryat Yam, Israel.

Vermouth started his football career in Haifa and played until the age of 20 with the local Hapoel side.

In a 2011 statistics about the highest proportion of dribbles completed per 90 minutes, in the 2010–11 UEFA Champions League season, Vermouth was ranked first with 75% from an average of 24 dribble attempts.

On 28 May 2011, he signed a four-year contract with the German club 1. FC Kaiserslautern who paid a transfer fee of €750,000 to Hapoel. He was joined by his Hapoel teammate Itay Shechter who also signed with the club.

International goals
Scores and results list Israel's goal tally first, score column indicates score after each Vermouth goal.

Honours

Club
Hapoel Tel Aviv
Israel State Cup: 2006, 2007, 2010, 2011
Israeli Premier League: 2009–10

Gent
Belgian Cup: runner-up 2008

Maccabi Tel Aviv
Israeli Premier League: 2014–15
Israel State Cup: 2014–2015

Maccabi Haifa
Israel State Cup: 2015–16

Hapoel Haifa
Israel State Cup: 2017–18
Israel Super Cup: 2018

Individual
Footballer of the Year in Israel: 2010

References

External links
UEFA.com profile

1985 births
Living people
People from Kiryat Yam
Israeli Ashkenazi Jews
Israeli footballers
Israel international footballers
Association football wingers
Hapoel Haifa F.C. players
Hapoel Tel Aviv F.C. players
K.A.A. Gent players
1. FC Kaiserslautern players
De Graafschap players
Maccabi Tel Aviv F.C. players
Maccabi Haifa F.C. players
Israeli Premier League players
Belgian Pro League players
Bundesliga players
Eredivisie players
Israeli expatriate footballers
Expatriate footballers in Belgium
Expatriate footballers in Germany
Expatriate footballers in the Netherlands
Israeli expatriate sportspeople in Belgium
Israeli expatriate sportspeople in Germany
Israeli expatriate sportspeople in the Netherlands
Israeli people of Belarusian-Jewish descent
Israeli Footballer of the Year recipients